Jordan competed at the 2014 Summer Youth Olympics, in Nanjing, China from 16 August to 28 August 2014.

Fencing

Jordan was given a quota to compete by the tripartite committee.

Girls

Gymnastics

Artistic Gymnastics

Jordan was given a quota to compete by the tripartite committee.

Boys

Swimming

Jordan qualified two swimmers.

Boys

Girls

Taekwondo

Jordan qualified two athletes based on its performance at the Taekwondo Qualification Tournament.

Girls

References

2014 in Jordanian sport
Nations at the 2014 Summer Youth Olympics
Jordan at the Youth Olympics